Ashley Shields (born June 15, 1985) is an American professional women's basketball player, most recently with the Detroit Shock of the WNBA. Shields, who attended Southwest Tennessee Community College, became the first WNBA player drafted out of a community college. The Houston Comets took her with the eighth pick in the 2007 WNBA Draft.

WNBA career
Shields debuted in 2007, appearing in 26 games her rookie season, averaging 5.3 points per game for the Comets. She played in just three games in 2008 before being waived. She was eventually signed by the Detroit Shock, appearing in seven regular season games and averaging 3.1 points per game. Shields also appeared in three playoff games during the Shock's title run, scoring two points.

Shields was traded to the Atlanta Dream before the 2009 season, but was waived before play began.

Overseas career
Shields signed with Israeli women's team Elitzur-Maccabi Netanya in 2008, and became the leading scorer in the Israeli women's league. In 2011, she left the team to join Dobri Anjeli Kosice in Slovakia.

References

1985 births
Living people
American expatriate basketball people in Israel
American expatriate basketball people in Slovakia
American women's basketball players
Basketball players from Memphis, Tennessee
Detroit Shock players
Houston Comets players
Junior college women's basketball players in the United States
Guards (basketball)